Tenoration is a 12-track jazz and funk double album by Pee Wee Ellis. It is an all-instrumental album. Its subtitle, From Jazz to Funk and Back reflects Pee Wee Ellis' affection to both jazz and funk music. On this production, Ellis uses two different rhythm sections. CD1 emphasizes mainly on funk, CD 2 mainly on jazz.

Reception
The album received positive reviews from critics. AllMusic rated it four stars with reviewer Hal Horowitz noting: "The playing is tough, uncompromising, and filled with substantial jazzy improvisation while keeping the backbeat rugged, especially on a lean but sizzling ten-minute take of Cannonball Adderley's Sticks... and prove that Ellis is equally adept at either jazz or funk, but perhaps best when he joins the two." Wayne Dawson of Jazzandbeyond wrote: "The first disk offers the best jazz-funk your ever likely to hear. The stamina levels are intense and everyone holds the line with the over ten minute 'Sticks' (a piece written by Julian Adderley) representing a high point...The second disk is just as up on it, with the same drummer carried over for the entire set (how could you let him go?).

Track listing

Disc 1 
 Slanky P (Pee Wee "Alfred" Ellis / Jim Payne) – 7:15
 Gittin’ a little hipper (James Brown /(Pee Wee "Alfred" Ellis / Bud Hobgood) – 3:01
 Bon Bonn ((Pee Wee "Alfred" Ellis) – 7:00
 Sticks (Cannonball Adderley) – 10:42
 Zig Zag (Pee Wee "Alfred" Ellis / Paul Rusky / Jim Schneider) – 7:01
 At Last (Mack Gordon / Harry Warren) – 6:04 #"Out of the Blue" (Wright, Terry) – 2:15

Disc 2 
 You've Changed (Bill Carey / Carl Fischer) – 4:30
 Sticks (Cannonball Adderley) – 4:11
 Parlayin’ (Pee Wee "Alfred" Ellis) – 4:30
 Sonnymoon for Two (Sonny Rollins) – 8:37
 Now Go On (Pee Wee "Alfred" Ellis) – 6:01
 Freedom Jazz Dance (Eddie Harris) – 4:47

Personnel 
Guitar: Tony Remy (1-6)
Keyboards: Dan Moore (1-6)
Piano: Gareth Williams (7-12)
Bass: Patrick Scales (1-6)
Bass: Laurence Cottle (7-12)
Drums: Guido May

References

2011 albums
Jazz albums by American artists
Funk albums by American artists